Leslie Medley (3 September 1920 – 22 February 2001) was an English footballer who played as a left winger.

Born in Edmonton, London, aged 11 he gained a scholarship place at the Latymer School in Edmonton. He played for the school team and was selected for the schoolboys' England eleven. Medley joined Tottenham Hotspur in 1939 and appeared as a guest player for West Ham United in World War II. Medley was a key man in the Tottenham Hotspur's famous 'push and run' side that won the First Division championship in 1950-51 having won the Second Division the season before, when Les was top scorer. He also won six England caps. He left London in 1953 and joined the Canadian champions Toronto Ulster United in the National Soccer League, joining Len Garwood his former Tottenham teammate.

References

1920 births
2001 deaths
English footballers
England international footballers
Tottenham Hotspur F.C. players
People educated at The Latymer School
West Ham United F.C. wartime guest players
English Football League players
English Football League representative players
English expatriate footballers
Expatriate soccer players in Canada
Association football midfielders
Footballers from Edmonton, London
Toronto Ulster United players
Canadian National Soccer League players
English expatriate sportspeople in Canada